Karl Albert (2 October 1921 – 9 October 2008) was a German philosopher and professor emeritus at Bergische Universität Wuppertal.

Born in Neheim, a borough of the Westphalia town of Arnsberg, Albert studied at University of Cologne and University of Bonn. His 1950 dissertation On the Aesthetics of the Sublime in German Idealism was written under the supervision of professor Erich Rothacker at University of Bonn. In the years 1952–1955 he was an assistant of Joseph Koch (a Meister Eckhart scholar) at Thomas-Institut in Cologne. 1958–1970 he taught philosophy at a local Gymnasium. In this period he majored in linguistics and classics. Then until 1972 he was a Lehrbeauftragter at the Ruhr-Universität in Bochum. In 1973 he was appointed Professor of Philosophy at the Pädagogischen Hochschule Rheinland. In 1980 he changed to Wuppertal's Bergischen Universität. Albert died in Cologne a week past his 87th birthday.

Works 
 1950 Die Lehre vom Erhabenen in der Ästhetik des deutschen Idealismus (dissertation)
 1968 Philosophie der modernen Kunst
 1974 Die ontologische Erfahrung
 1975 Zur Metaphysik Lavelles
 1976 Meister Eckharts These vom Sein
 1977 Spirituelle Poesie
 1978 Hesiod, Theogonie, Ratingen
 1980 Griechische Religion und platonische Philosophie
 1981 Das gemeinsame Sein
 1982 Vom Kult zum Logos
 1984 Philosophische Pädagogik
 1986 Mystik und Philosophie
 1988 Meister Eckhart: Kommentar zum Buch der Weisheit
 1988 Philosophische Studien I: Philosophie der Philosophie
 1989 Platons Begriff der Philosophie
 1989 Philosophische Studien II: Philosophie der Kunst
 1990 Philosophische Studien V: Philosophie der Erziehung
 1991 Philosophische Studien III: Philosophie der Religion
 1992 Philosophische Studien IV: Philosophie der Sozialität
 1995 Lebensphilosophie. Von den Anfängen bei Nietzsche bis zu ihrer Kritik bei Lucács
 1996 Einführung in die philosophische Mystik
 2000 Philosophie als Form des Lebens (with Elenor Jain).
 2003 Die Utopie der Moral. Versuch einer kulturübergreifenden ontologischen Ethik (with Elenor Jain).

External links 
 Sammlung Karl Albert The collected works of Karl Albert published by the Academia Verlag.
 Röll Verlag Karl Albert's publisher.
 Alber Verlag Publisher of Albert's latest books.
 Karl Albert's biography 

1921 births
2008 deaths
People from Arnsberg
University of Cologne alumni
University of Bonn alumni
Academic staff of the University of Wuppertal
German male writers
20th-century German philosophers